The Grafton Bridge is a heritage-listed bascule truss bridge that carries the Bent Street (formerly Summerland Way) and North Coast railway line across the Clarence River in Grafton, New South Wales, Australia. The bridge links the Grafton central business district with South Grafton, and was added to the New South Wales State Heritage Register on 2 April 1999.

History 

A bridge over the Clarence River in Grafton was first conceived in 1915. The original design called for a railway bridge with a footway, but in 1922 the design was changed to accommodate vehicular traffic as well. The bridge was built from 1927 to 1932, although planning for the bridge had been under way as early as 1921. The bridge was designed and built by the New South Wales Public Works Department with steelwork from Clyde Engineering. The department decided to construct the bridge itself after being unhappy with the high cost proposed by private tenderers for the project. It was formally opened by Governor-General of Australia Sir Isaac Isaacs on 19 July 1932.

First bridge 
The upper level of the bridge supports a two way road for traffic via Bent Street, and its lower level supports a rail bridge that carries the North Coast railway line, a water main, and footbridges on either side.

There is provision for a second track across the bridge but at this time it is being used as an easement for a water main.

The bascule span was operational from its opening in 1932 until 1969. The bascule can no longer be raised due to an added water main. With the decline in shipping along the Clarence River, the opening span was sealed shut and it can no longer be opened.

The bridge heritage listing also includes the three remnant spans of the 1915 timber viaduct south of Grafton railway station, which now remain in situ amidst parkland.

Heritage listing 
This bridge is a double-deck road/rail structure, the only one of its type in New South Wales. There is a lift span to allow passing of river traffic that is no longer in use. The bridge presents a commanding visual reminder of rail and road to residents of Grafton. Opening of the bridge in 1932 completed the North coast standard gauge line between Sydney and Brisbane, avoiding the winding route via Tenterfield.

The viaduct along with the wharf remains are important relics of the development of the north coast railway. The viaduct is representative of similar structures constructed at a range of locations, many of which have been replaced.

The Grafton Bridge was listed on the New South Wales State Heritage Register on 2 April 1999 having satisfied the following criteria.

The place possesses uncommon, rare or endangered aspects of the cultural or natural history of New South Wales.

This item is assessed as historically rare. This item is assessed as scientifically rare. This item is assessed as arch. rare. This item is assessed as socially rare.

Second bridge 

Due to high traffic volumes a new parallel bridge was built known as New Grafton Bridge, in November 2016 and the bridge was opened on 12 December 2019 by Chris Gulaptis, the Member for Clarence. The New Grafton Bridge consists of two lanes and has been designed to be increased to four lanes when traffic levels require it. The bridge also carries a grade-separated footpath and cycleway.

Gallery

See also 

 List of bridges in Australia
 List of railway bridges in New South Wales
 List of road bridges in New South Wales

References

Attribution

External links
 
 
 

Railway bridges in New South Wales
Bridges completed in 1932
Bridges completed in 2019
Grafton, New South Wales
Bascule bridges
Road-rail bridges in Australia
Steel bridges in Australia
Truss bridges in Australia
Concrete bridges in Australia
Girder bridges
New South Wales State Heritage Register
Articles incorporating text from the New South Wales State Heritage Register
Road bridges in New South Wales
1932 establishments in Australia
2019 establishments in Australia
North Coast railway line, New South Wales